Gustine is a city in Merced County, California. At the 2020 census, the city population was 6,110, up from 5,520 at the 2010 census.

Geography

Climate
This region experiences hot and dry summers, with no average monthly temperatures above 71.6 °F.  According to the Köppen Climate Classification system, Gustine has a warm-summer Mediterranean climate, abbreviated "Csb" on climate maps.

History
Gustine was established in the early 1900s as a station on the Southern Pacific Railroad and named after Sara Miller, nicknamed "Gussie", the daughter of Henry Miller, the "Cattle King", an early California land baron and Agricultural pioneer. Little Sara, always getting "gussied up" with fancy clothes, was killed when she was thrown from her horse when she was eight years old. The first post office opened in 1907. The city was incorporated in 1915.

Gustine was the site of the first 9-1-1 system in California, installed in March 1970.

Gustine is home to the nation's largest festa which is steeped in Portuguese tradition.

Gustine High School is home to the longest running basketball tournament in the state of California, which is put on by the city's Rotary Club. The tournament has been put on by the Rotary Club and celebrated its 75th anniversary in 2017.

Demographics

2010
At the 2010 census Gustine had a population of 5,520. The racial makeup of Gustine was 3,875 (70.2%) White, 73 (1.3%) African American, 54 (1.0%) Native American, 95 (1.7%) Asian, 8 (0.1%) Pacific Islander, 1,191 (21.6%) from other races, and 224 (4.1%) from two or more races. Hispanic or Latino of any race were 2,769 persons (50.2%).

The whole population lived in households, no one lived in non-institutionalized group quarters and no one was institutionalized.

There were 1,879 households, 757 (40.3%) had children under the age of 18 living in them, 1,025 (54.6%) were opposite-sex married couples living together, 227 (12.1%) had a female householder with no husband present, 118 (6.3%) had a male householder with no wife present. There were 98 (5.2%) unmarried opposite-sex partnerships, and 5 (0.3%) same-sex married couples or partnerships. 437 households (23.3%) were one person and 234 (12.5%) had someone living alone who was 65 or older. The average household size was 2.94. There were 1,370 families (72.9% of households); the average family size was 3.50.

The age distribution was 1,577 people (28.6%) under the age of 18, 481 people (8.7%) aged 18 to 24, 1,352 people (24.5%) aged 25 to 44, 1,319 people (23.9%) aged 45 to 64, and 791 people (14.3%) who were 65 or older. The median age was 35.3 years. For every 100 females, there were 98.3 males.  For every 100 females age 18 and over, there were 96.4 males.

There were 2,087 housing units at an average density of 1,345.6 per square mile, of the occupied units 1,197 (63.7%) were owner-occupied and 682 (36.3%) were rented. The homeowner vacancy rate was 3.4%; the rental vacancy rate was 12.2%. 3,348 people (60.7% of the population) lived in owner-occupied housing units and 2,172 people (39.3%) lived in rental housing units.

2000
As of the United States 2000 Census, there were 4,698 people in 1,683 households, including 1,216 families, in the city. The racial makeup of the city was 72.26% White, 0.72% Black or African American, 0.98% Native American, 1.51% Asian, 0.06% Pacific Islander, 18.97% from other races, and 5.49% from two or more races.  35.08% of the population were Hispanic or Latino of any race.

Gustine is home to a relatively high concentration of ethnic Portuguese-Americans. Most can trace their ancestry back to the Azores, but the Portuguese-speaking community also welcomes many families from mainland Portugal and Brazil. This is shown by a large turnout in the yearly OLM (Our Lady of Miracles) Portuguese Festa when over 20,000 people from around Gustine and far away come to visit.

Of the 1,683 households 36.2% had children under the age of 18 living with them, 56.3% were married couples living together, 11.8% had a female householder with no husband present, and 27.7% were non-families. 24.7% of households were one person and 15.0% were one person aged 65 or older. The average household size was 2.79 and the average family size was 3.34.

The age distribution was 30.2% under the age of 18, 8.2% from 18 to 24, 25.6% from 25 to 44, 20.0% from 45 to 64, and 15.9% 65 or older. The median age was 35 years. For every 100 females, there were 94.9 males. For every 100 females age 18 and over, there were 88.8 males.

The median household income was $38,824 and the median family income  was $45,583. Males had a median income of $35,920 versus $22,149 for females. The per capita income for the city was $16,821. About 11.5% of families and 16.9% of the population were below the poverty line, including 22.5% of those under age 18 and 15.4% of those age 65 or over.

Much of the town's income has traditionally come from dairy production and processing; Gustine is the home of a Golden Valley Cheese factory and formerly a Carnation processing plant. In addition, Morningstar Distributing, Hillview Packing, Pusateri Nut Company, and Ingomar Tomato Plant, and Wolfsens' Meat and Sausage are significant businesses in the area. As agricultural land becomes covered by housing developments, Gustine is becoming a bedroom community to the San Francisco Bay Area, a 1½ hour commute away.

Government

Environmental issues
The nearby San Luis National Wildlife Refuge (formerly Kesterson Wildlife Refuge), experienced an accumulation of selenium due to its location at the terminus of the incomplete San Luis Drain. Wildlife in this region developed a number of deformities, drawing the attention of news media and leading to the closure of the refuge.

Education
Gustine is served by the Gustine Unified School District (GUSD) a unified TK–12 public school district, and by the Our Lady of Miracles Catholic School (K-8).  There are five schools in the GUSD: Gustine Elementary School (GES), Romero Elementary School (RES), Gustine Middle School (GMS), Gustine High School (GHS), and Pioneer High School (PHS), a continuation school.

Transportation
Gustine is located at the intersection of State Route 33 and State Route 140, near the intersection of Interstate 5 and State Route 140.

Gustine is served by public Dial-A-Ride from Merced County's The Bus. The service connects Gustine with Los Banos and Dos Palos, and other communities on the west side of Merced County.

The city is also served by Stanislaus Regional Transit Authority route 45W providing connections Monday through Saturday to Newman, Crows Landing, and Patterson. This service to Gustine is proposed to be discontinued in early 2023

References

External links
 
 Factual Information from www.city-data.com
 Gustine Unified School District Website

Incorporated cities and towns in California
Cities in Merced County, California
1915 establishments in California